The name Liesel is short for Elizabeth. The name was most popular during the 17th century.

Liesel can also refer to:
Liesl Von Trapp, a character in The Sound of Music
Liesel Meminger, a character in The Book Thief
Liesel Matthews (born Liesel Pritzker), an American heiress and actress.
Liesel Westermann, a German athlete who competed mainly in the discus throw.
Liesel Litzenburger, a writer from Michigan.
Liesel Holler, the 2004 Miss Peru (for Miss Earth 2004).
Liesel Moak Skorpen, a children's author.